Fossil Ridge High School may refer to 

Fossil Ridge High School (Fort Collins, Colorado)
Fossil Ridge High School (Fort Worth, Texas)